Yonggang-dong is both an administrative and legal dong or a neighbourhood in the administrative subdivisions of the Gyeongju City, North Gyeongsang province, South Korea. It is bordered by Bukgun-dong on the east, Deoksan-ri of Cheonbuk-myeon on the northeast, Hwangseong-dong and Dongcheon-dong on the south and Geumjang-ri of Hyeongok-myeon on the south. Its 5.06 square kilometers are home to about 15,817 people. It has two elementary schools, a middle school and a high school

See also
Subdivisions of Gyeongju
Administrative divisions of South Korea

References

External links
 The official site of the Yonggang-dong office

Subdivisions of Gyeongju
Neighbourhoods in South Korea